United Bowl may refer to:
 The championship game of the former United Indoor Football league from 2005 to 2008
 The championship game of the Indoor Football League, which acquired UIF, from 2009 to the present
 The proposed name of the 2009 UFL Championship Game